Brunčević is a surname. Notable people include:

 Ensar Brunčević (born 1999), Serbian footballer
 Mirsad Brunčević (born 1994), Serbian footballer
 Sead Brunčević (born 1977), Serbian footballer

Surnames
Serbian surnames
Bosnian surnames